Ozoir may refer to two communes in France:
Ozoir-la-Ferrière, in the Seine-et-Marne department
Ozoir-le-Breuil, in the Eure-et-Loir department